The Dignity of the Nobodies is a 2005 Argentine documentary film directed by Fernando Solanas.

Plot 
The film focuses on the life of several Argentine persons after the December 2001 riots in Argentina. It highlights the aims and wishes of the outcasts and their hopes.

References

2005 films
Argentine documentary films
Films directed by Fernando Solanas
Documentary films about Argentina
2000s Argentine films